Saurita geralda is a moth in the subfamily Arctiinae. It was described by Schaus in 1924. It is found in Venezuela.

References

Natural History Museum Lepidoptera generic names catalog

Moths described in 1924
Saurita